Emmental, Emmentaler, or Emmenthal is a yellow, medium-hard cheese that originated in the area around Emmental, in the canton of Bern in Switzerland. It is classified as a Swiss-type or Alpine cheese.

Emmental was first mentioned in written records in 1293, but first called by its present name in 1542. It has a savory but mild taste. While "Emmentaler" is registered as a geographical indication in Switzerland, a limited number of countries recognize the term as a geographical indication: similar cheeses of other origins, especially from France (as Emmental), the Netherlands, Bavaria, and Finland, are widely available and sold by that name. In some parts of the world, the names "Emmentaler" and "Swiss cheese" are used interchangeably for Emmental-style cheese.

Production
Three types of bacteria are needed to prepare Emmental: Streptococcus thermophilus, Lactobacillus helveticus, and Propionibacterium freudenreichii. Historically, the holes were a sign of imperfection, and until modern times, cheese makers would try to avoid them. Nowadays, however, eye formation is valued as a sign of maturation and quality and acoustic analysis has been developed for this purpose. Emmental cheese is usually consumed cold, as chunks or slices, and is also used in a variety of dishes, particularly in gratins, and fondue, in which it is mixed with Gruyère, the other highly popular Swiss cheese.

Protected varieties and nomenclature
Several varieties of Emmental are registered as geographical indications, including:

Switzerland

 Emmentaler was registered in 2000 as an appellation d'origine contrôlée (AOC) in Switzerland. In 2013, it was replaced by the appellation d'origine protégée (AOP) certification. The Emmentaler produced according to the AOC-registration needs to be produced in small rural dairies with raw cow's milk, adding only natural ingredients (water, salt, natural starter cultures and rennet); preservatives or ingredients from genetically modified organisms are not allowed. The cheese is produced in a round shape with a natural rind, and aged in traditional cellars for a minimum of four months. Emmentaler must be produced in Kantons Aargau, Bern (except Amtsbezirk Moutier), Glarus, Luzern, Schwyz, Solothurn, St. Gallen, Thurgau, Zug or Zürich,or in the See- and Sensebezirk of Kanton Freiburg.

Emmentaler is also recognized as a geographical indication in the Czech Republic, France, Georgia, Germany, Hungary, Jamaica, Portugal, Russia, Slovakia and Spain.

Outside Switzerland

Three cheeses containing the word Emmental are protected under EU law:
 Allgäuer Emmentaler, from Bavaria, Germany, has PDO status
 Emmental de Savoie, from Savoie, France, has PGI status
 Emmental français est-central from Franche-Comté, France, also has PGI status

In many parts of the English-speaking world the terms "Emmentaler" and "Swiss cheese" are both used to refer to any cheese of the Emmental type, whether produced in Switzerland or elsewhere. The United States Department of Agriculture, for example, uses the terms 'Swiss cheese' and 'Emmentaler cheese' interchangeably.

Emmental-style cheeses
Emmental cheese is very widely imitated around the world, often just called "Swiss cheese".  Specific European types include:
Grevé from Sweden
Jarlsberg cheese from Norway
Maasdam cheese from the Netherlands, with Leerdammer one variety

See also
List of Swiss cheeses
Swiss cheeses and dairy products
Culinary Heritage of Switzerland

References

External links

Cook's Thesaurus: Semi-Firm Cheeses

Swiss cheeses
Canton of Bern
Cow's-milk cheeses
Culinary Heritage of Switzerland
Cheese with eyes
European cuisine